The badminton women's doubles tournament at the 1990 Asian Games in Beijing Sports Complex, Beijing, China took place from 2 October to 6 October.

The Chinese duo of Guan Weizhen and Nong Qunhua won the gold medal in this tournament after beating a South Korean pair in the final 2–0.

Indonesia and another team from China shared the bronze medal.

Schedule
All times are China Standard Time (UTC+08:00)

Results

References
Results

External links
 Olympic Council of Asia

Women's doubles